Rosignano is the name of a number of places in Italy:
Rosignano Marittimo, a commune of the Province of Livorno in Tuscany.
Rosignano Solvay, a frazione of Rosignano Marittimo
Rosignano Airfield an abandoned World War II military airfield near Rosignano Marittimo
Rosignano Monferrato, a commune of the Province of Alessandria in Piedmont.